Warcq may refer to the following places in France:

 Warcq, Ardennes, a commune in the Ardennes department
 Warcq, Meuse, a commune in the Meuse department